Kammarensemblen (KeN), is a Swedish chamber music  ensemble. The group was created in Stockholm in 1984 and has today a big repertoar for small as well as big orchestras. The group is performing in Sweden as well as international festivals all over the world.

History
 2012: A cooperation with the Cullberg Ballet and Fotografiska museet

Discography
 1992: Kammarensemblen, The Swedish ensemble for new music (Phono Suecia PSCD 57). Ansgar Krook dirigerar verk av Anders Eliasson, Henrik Strindberg, Bengt Hambraeus, Gunnar Valkare och Lars Ekström.

References

External links
Official Website

Swedish musical groups